The 2004 Days of Thunder season was the 4th season of United Kingdom-based NASCAR style stock car racing, originally known as ASCAR. For this season the Days of Thunder brand was adopted entirely in place of the ASCAR name having been introduced as a promotional brand the previous season.

Teams and drivers

Race calendar

All races were held at the Rockingham Motor Speedway in Corby, Northamptonshire.

The season consisted of six meetings of two races taking place on the first Sunday of each month from May to October. The grid for the opening race of each meeting was set by a qualifying session with the second race grid being set by the finishing order of the first.

Final points standings

External links
 

Stock car racing in the United Kingdom
ASCAR